Whitefield Schools It is a special school in Walthamstow in the London Borough of Waltham Forest, offering support for children with a wide range of special physical, educational and behavioural needs and difficulties.

The school became part of the Whitefield Academy Trust multi-academy trust in April 2014. The same site also contains the Whitefield's Research and Development Centre, home of the academy's training functions, an outreach service and a specialist library.

There are three 'sub-schools' within Whitefield schools:

 Peter Turner Primary School –  For pupils aged 3–11 years old with autism or speech and communication difficulties.
 Niels Chapman Secondary School – For pupils aged 11–19 years old.
 Margaret Brearley School – For pupils aged 3–19 years old with more complex needs including learning difficulties, physical impairment and sensory impairment.

Joseph Clarke School is also part of Whitefield Academy Trust.

References

Special schools in the London Borough of Waltham Forest
Educational institutions established in 1903
1903 establishments in England
Academies in the London Borough of Waltham Forest
Walthamstow